Merzomyia westermanni is a species of tephritid or fruit flies in the genus Merzomyia of the family Tephritidae.

Distribution
Britain & France to Switzerland, Ukraine, Caucasus.

References

Tephritinae
Insects described in 1826
Diptera of Europe